The Riverside Park Bandshell is a bandshell located in Riverside Park in Murphysboro, Illinois. The concrete bandshell was built in 1938–39 by the Works Progress Administration and the Murphysboro Park District. Riverside Park was opened in 1907; it was originally known as Buster Brown Park, as it was initially owned by the Brown Shoe Company. The park began hosting Murphysboro's annual 4th of July celebration in 1927, and the bandshell became part of the day's events as soon as it opened. The bandshell's inaugural concert occurred on July 4, 1939, and received an audience of 45,000; since then, the bandshell has hosted the opening concert for the celebrations each year. The bandshell has also hosted annual music festivals highlighting jazz, blues, and bluegrass musicians and provides a stage for other community events in the park.

The bandshell was added to the National Register of Historic Places on June 6, 2012.

It was designed by architect Rudolph Zerses Gill.

References

Park buildings and structures on the National Register of Historic Places in Illinois
Music venues in Illinois
Works Progress Administration in Illinois
National Register of Historic Places in Jackson County, Illinois
Event venues on the National Register of Historic Places in Illinois
1939 establishments in Illinois
Music venues completed in 1939
Caleres
Band shells
Tourist attractions in Jackson County, Illinois